Batu Caves was a state constituency in Selangor, Malaysia, that has been represented in the Selangor State Legislative Assembly from 2004 to 2018.

The state constituency was created in the 2003 redistribution and is mandated to return a single member to the Selangor State Legislative Assembly under the first past the post voting system.

From 2018, this constituency abolished, renamed to re-created as Sungai Tua.

History 
2004–2016: The constituency contains the polling districts of Wira Damai, Taman Jasa, Sungai Tua, Kampung Nakhoda, Kampung Laksamana, Selayang Baharu Empat, Selayang Baharu Lima, Taman Selayang, Taman Batu Caves, Pekan Batu Caves Lama, Batu Caves, Batu 8 Sungai Tua.

2016–present: The constituency contains the polling districts of Wira Damai, Taman Jasa, Sungai Tua, Kampung Nakhoda, Kampung Laksamana, Selayang Baharu Empat, Selayang Baharu Lima, Taman Selayang, Taman Batu Caves, Pekan Batu Caves Lama, Batu Caves, Batu 8 Sungai Tua.

Results

References 

 

Selangor state constituencies